The San Carlos was an 18th-century Spanish packet boat built in 1765 at the Royal Shipyard of Havana, Cuba. The ship entered service in 1765 with two-decks and 80 guns. In 1775, the San Carlos was the first ship to enter San Francisco Bay, under the command of Spanish naval officer and explorer Lieutenant Juan Manuel de Ayala. In 1801, it sailed to Cartagena, Spain, and converted into a three-deck ship with 112 guns.

Construction and service 
The San Carlos was built in 1765 at the Royal Shipyard of Havana, on the island of Cuba. It was launched on April 30, 1765. The Spanish two-masted galleon was 58-ft. in length and carried 80 guns. It could handle a crew of 30 men.

San Diego expedition

During the Spanish rule of California, Spain's inspector general José de Gálvez organized a Portola Expedition for a joint land-sea movement up the Pacific coast. It was led by Gaspar de Portolá, governor of Las Californias. The first leg of the expedition consisted of five groups all departing from Baja California and heading north for San Diego. Three groups traveled by sea while two others traveled by land in mule trains. The three ships built in San Blas, Mexico, set sail for San Diego in early 1768. The  flagship San Carlos, captained by Don Vicente Vila, a lieutenant of the Royal Navy; the San Antonio, captained by Juan Pérez, a native of Palma de Majorca; and the San José. The ships crossed the Gulf of California, from San Blas and reached the east coast harbor of La Paz at the tip of Baja California, on December 1768, requiring repairs. They San Carlos had to unload so that repairs could be made.

On January 9, 1769, the flagship San Carlos left the port of La Paz. Inspector general Gálvez, padre Junípero Serra, and the town residents blessed and send off the San Carlos and its chaplain, Franciscan friar Fernando Parrón. Don Vicente Vila was still in command, followed by lieutenant Pedro Fages, who became Lieutenant Governor of the Californias under Gaspar de Portolá, and engineer and cartographer Miguel Costansó. Gálvez supervised the repairs and loading of the ship. It carried 25 Catalan soldiers under Fages' command; surgeon Pedro Prat of the Royal Navy, and Hernando Patron as chaplain.

The San Antonio arrived in San Diego Bay on April 11, 1769, and the San Carlos on April 29th. Many crew members on both ships had fallen ill, mostly from scurvy; all but two on the San Carlos crewman had died. The expedition's surgeon Prat struggled to treat the ill men, as he was weakened from scurvy. Friar Parrón had become weak with scurvy as well. Despite the efforts of Prat, many of the ill men died in San Diego. Because of the men lost on the San Carlos, it was decided that the San Carlos, Father Serra, and Vila would remain in San Diego.

San Francisco Bay expedition 

Six years later, the Spanish naval vessel San Carlos took on supplies and left Monterey on July 26, 1775, to San Francisco. After that, they continued north to locate the "Bay of San Francisco", and claim the area for Spain. The San Carlos was the first ship to enter the San Francisco Bay, under the command of Spanish naval officer and explorer, Lieutenant Juan Manuel de Ayala. It was sent by viceroy Antonio María de Bucareli to survey the waters of the San Francisco Bay. The San Carlos reached the Golden Gate entrance to the San Francisco Bay on August 5, 1775.

The San Carlos dropped anchor by an island which was christened the Isla de los Ángeles, now known as Angel Island. The ship pilots set out in longboats to chart the rivers of the bay. On August 12, 1775, Ayala gave the name La Isla de los Alcatraces, now called Yerba Buena Island. The ship remained in the Bay until September 18, 1775, returning to San Blas. Ayala gave a full account of the geography of the San Francisco Bay.

The California Historical Landmark marker No. 236, honors the San Carlos, which was the first ship to enter San Francisco Bay. The marker is located in the Aquatic Park Historic District near the corner of Beach and Larkin Streets. Below is a quote from this landmark.

Conversion
In 1801, the San Carlos sailed to Cartagena, Spain and it was converted into a three-deck ship with 112-guns. She was broken up in 1819 in Cartagena.

See also

List of ships of the line of Spain
Spanish Navy
California Historical Landmarks in San Francisco
Jorge Juan y Santacilia

References

External links
 California Historical Landmarks in San Francisco

Individual sailing vessels
Ships built in Cuba
1765 ships
Galleons
Age of Sail ships of Spain
San Francisco Bay